The Robotic Workshop was a toy kit, much like Lego Mindstorms, that allowed users to build and program robots using a home computer. 

Access Software announced The Robotic Workshop in the January 1987 issue of Ahoy! magazine. A review later appeared in the May 1988 issue of Compute! magazine. The kit included over 50 Capsela parts, including two motors, gears, wheels, and sensors. It was later released for Apple, Atari, and IBM computers.

External links
Review in Compute!

Robot kits
1987 robots
Robots of the United States